Taranucnus is a genus of sheet weavers that was first described by Eugène Louis Simon in 1884.

Species
 it contains six species, found in Europe and the United States:
Taranucnus beskidicus Hirna, 2018 – Ukraine
Taranucnus bihari Fage, 1931 – Poland, Slovakia, Romania, Ukraine
Taranucnus carpaticus Gnelitsa, 2016 – Ukraine
Taranucnus nishikii Yaginuma, 1972 – Japan
Taranucnus ornithes (Barrows, 1940) – USA
Taranucnus setosus (O. Pickard-Cambridge, 1863) (type) – Europe, Turkey, Russia (Europe to Central Siberia)

See also
 List of Linyphiidae species (Q–Z)

References

Araneomorphae genera
Linyphiidae
Spiders of Asia
Spiders of North America